The 1937 Ball State Cardinals football team was an American football team that represented Ball State Teachers College (later renamed Ball State University) in the Indiana Intercollegiate Conference (IIC) during the 1937 college football season. In their third season under head coach John Magnabosco, the Cardinals compiled a 5–2–1 record (5–1–1 against IIC opponents), finished in fourth place out of 15 teams in the IIC, shut out four of eight opponents, and outscored all opponents by a total of 135 to 38. The team played its home games at Ball State Athletic Field in Muncie, Indiana.

Schedule

References

Ball State
Ball State Cardinals football seasons
Ball State Cardinals football